The St. Francis of Assisi Church also alternatively called Pro Cathedral of St. Francis of Assisi is a religious building belonging to the Catholic Church and serves as the pro-cathedral or temporary cathedral in the city of Oranjestad, on the Caribbean island of Aruba, an autonomous country in the Kingdom of the Netherlands in the Lesser Antilles.

It is a church that follows the Roman or Latin rite and is within the Diocese of Willemstad (Dioecesis Gulielmopolitana). This is one of the most important churches in Aruba that was built in 1813 and offering religious services in Papiamento and English.

See also
Roman Catholicism in Aruba
St. Francis of Assisi Church (disambiguation)

References

Francis of Assisi
Buildings and structures in Oranjestad, Aruba
Francis of Assisi, Oranjestad
1813 establishments in Curaçao and Dependencies
19th-century Roman Catholic church buildings
19th-century churches in the Netherlands